The cliff tomb of Hatshepsut is the tomb quarried for her as Great Royal Wife of Thutmose II. It is located in Wady Sikkat Taqet Zaid, to the west of the Valley of the Kings near Luxor, Egypt. It is unfinished, with the cutting of the burial chamber never being completed. Although never used for a burial, it did contain a sarcophagus inscribed for Hatshepsut as Great Royal Wife. Originally found by local diggers, the tomb was later excavated by Howard Carter on behalf of the Earl of Carnarvon in 1916.

Location, discovery, and excavation 
The tomb is located in a "remote and unfrequented" part of the Theban necropolis, in Wady Sikkat Taqet Zaid, a branch of Wady Gabbanat el-Qurud, on the western side of the mountains from the Valley of the Kings. This area likely served as a burial ground for queens during the early Eighteenth Dynasty.

The tomb was discovered by locals in October 1916. With World War I underway, reduced numbers of antiquities officials, combined with the economic depression of the war, led to a rise in tomb robbery in the Theban area. Howard Carter recounts that the discovery of the tomb was made by a local group, who, once word of the find spread, were driven off the claim by a rival gang. Carter, on holiday in Luxor, was approached by local leaders and asked to resolve the situation. When Carter and his workmen arrived at the tomb, they found the robbers still at work:
It was midnight when we arrived on the scene, and the guide pointed out to me the end of a rope, which dangled sheer down the face of a cliff. Listening, we could hear the robbers actually at work, so first I severed their rope, thereby cutting off their means of escape, and then, making secure a good stout rope of my own, I lowered myself down the cliff... There were eight at work... I gave the alternative of clearing out by means of my rope or else staying where they were without any rope at all, and eventually they saw reason and departed.

Carter's clearance of the tomb took twenty days, with workmen working relay shifts day and night. Access to the tomb was improved with a timber structure and a projecting stage which allowed an easier ascent from the floor of the valley.

Layout and contents 
A further steeper corridor leads from the antechamber to another square room, the sepulchral hall. In the centre of the floor of this hall is cut a steep passage which leads to an unfinished room, presumably intended to be the burial chamber.

The floor of the sepulchral hall was covered in limestone slabs which Carter suggests were intended to form a plinth for the sarcophagus, or were intended to seal the tomb. He noted that similarity between these slabs and those found in KV20 and KV38, where they were decorated with scenes from the Amduat. It is inscribed with texts naming Hatshepsut as Great Royal Wife, among other titles, indicating that it predated her rise to regent and pharaoh. The rectangular lid of the sarcophagus is carved with a long cartouche containing a figure of Nut facing left and raising her arms to embrace the deceased; it had been broken into two pieces.

References 

1916 archaeological discoveries
Hatshepsut